Prasad Art Productions or Prasad Art Pictures Private Limited is a movie production house in South India. They produced about 20 films, mostly in Telugu. The company headed by Anumolu Venkata Subba Rao. Their first film was Pempudu Koduku, directed by L. V. Prasad. Illarikam, directed by T. Prakash Rao, was their biggest hit of 1959. Other notable films include Bharya Bharthalu, Brahmachari, and Aalu Magalu.

Notes

External links
 Profile of Prasad Art Productions at IMDb
 Profile of Prasad Art Pictures at IMDb

Film production companies based in Hyderabad, India
Indian companies established in 1953
Mass media companies established in 1953